The Brahma white-bellied rat (Niviventer brahma) is a species of rodent in the family Muridae. It is found in northeastern India, northern Myanmar, and southwestern China (Yunnan).

References

Rats of Asia
Niviventer
Rodents of China
Rodents of India
Rodents of Myanmar
Mammals described in 1914
Taxa named by Oldfield Thomas
Taxonomy articles created by Polbot